= Lipid fingerprint =

Topic in membrane biology

Lipid fingerprints are unique lipid distributions around membrane proteins. They were first introduced by Siewert Marrink and Peter Tieleman et al., who used molecular dynamics to map the unique lipid distributions around numerous membrane proteins in a complex model lipid environment. The concept rapidly gained popularity among membrane biologists and is generally considered to have superseded the concept of a lipid annulus around a membrane protein. It has been argued that lipid fingerprints are a fundamental aspect of a giant protein-lipid code that functionalizes membranes.

== Features ==
Lipid fingerprints include lipids that are both tightly bound to the surface of a protein as well as those that are more loosely associated and those that are more distant. Importantly, since every protein has a unique structure, each lipid fingerprint is also unique. It has been suggested that lipid fingerprints play a role in controlling the clustering of membrane proteins. Since biological membranes contain many different lipids, it is expected that a lipid fingerprint is very complex and typically involves a great variety of lipids. Lipids that do not belong to a fingerprint have been termed void zone, and together fingerprint zones and void zones comprise all membrane lipids.

== Notable examples ==
The mechanosensitive channel Piezo2 has a complex lipid fingerprint that tends to include phosphoinositide lipids with long residency times. The notable cancer target KRas's lipid fingerprint is highly sensitive to its conformational state.
